Sar Kariz or Sar-e Kariz or Sarkariz or Sar-e-Kariz or Sar-i-Kariz may refer to:
 Sarkariz, Kurdistan
 Sar Kariz, Razavi Khorasan
 Sar-e-Kariz, South Khorasan